Davide Tardozzi (born in Ravenna, 30 January 1959) is a former Italian Superbike racer and current race team manager.

After an unsuccessful attempt at competing in the 250cc Grand Prix world championships in 1984 and 1985, Tardozzi turned his attentions to superbike racing. In the inaugural 1988 Superbike World Championship season, Tardozzi won five races on a Yamaha-powered Bimota, more than any other competitor, yet still finished third in the championship due to inconsistent results. He claimed the 1988 Italian superbike national championship as consolation. Tardozzi was a seven times Italian Superbike Champion as a rider, and a five times winner in World Superbike championship races. In 1991 he was the 750cc Superbike European Champion.

After retiring from racing, he went on to be a successful team manager for the Ducati factory racing team, winning several Superbike World Championships with Carl Fogarty, Troy Corser, James Toseland and Troy Bayliss. In total Tardozzi has won eight Riders' Championships as a Ducati team manager.

After his shock departure from Ducati at the end of the 2009 season, Davide Tardozzi made a no less surprising move to become the new team manager of the official BMW Motorrad racing team in the 2010 World Superbike championship.

He has since returned to Ducati in a Team Coordinator role in MotoGP.

References 

1959 births
Living people
Sportspeople from Ravenna
Italian motorcycle racers
Superbike World Championship riders
250cc World Championship riders